Andrea Vilaró (born 9 May 1993) is a Spanish basketball player. She plays as a small forward in the Spanish league for CB Avenida and the Spanish national team.

Club career
Vilaró started playing with the youth teams of Segle XXI in 2006, reaching the senior team and playing in the Spanish League second tier for the last two seasons. She played for the Florida Gators for the 2011-12 season. From 2012 to 2015 she played for three clubs in the Spanish top tier league: CD Zamarat, CB Ciudad de Burgos and CB Al-Qázeres. She spent the following four seasons, 2015-2019, at Cadí La Seu.  On 10 May 2019, she signed for CB Avenida, one of the top teams of the league.

EuroCup statistics

National team
Vilaró started playing with Spain's youth teams at 15, winning a total of six medals from 2008 to 2013. She made her debut with the senior team in 2019, when she was 26 years old, becoming champion of the FIBA Women's EuroBasket 2019.

  2008 FIBA Europe Under-16 Championship (youth) 
  2009 FIBA Europe Under-16 Championship (youth) (All-Tournament Team)
 8th 2010 FIBA Under-17 World Championship (youth)
  2010 FIBA Europe Under-18 Championship (youth)
  2011 FIBA Europe Under-18 Championship (youth)
  2012 FIBA Europe Under-20 Championship (youth)
  2013 FIBA Europe Under-20 Championship (youth) 
  2019 Eurobasket

References

1993 births
Living people
Basketball players from Barcelona
Florida Gators women's basketball players
Small forwards
Spanish women's basketball players
Spanish expatriate basketball people in the United States